Pia Andersson is a Swedish European champion bridge player.

Bridge accomplishments

Wins
 European Women Teams Championship: 2004
 European Mixed Pairs Champions 1998

Runners-up

References

Swedish contract bridge players
Living people
Year of birth missing (living people)